The 2021–22 Maltese Challenge League (referred to as the BOV Challenge League for sponsorship reasons) was the second-level league football in Malta. It was the second season that the competition ran in its present form.

Following the decision of the Maltese Football Association Executive Committee, the teams that had finished in the promotion and relegation places in the previous Challenge League season would remain in the Challenge League in the 2021-22 season (with the exception of Qormi, due to less than 75% of the matches having been completed in the competition. Relegation from the Premier League and promotion from the National Amateur League remained in place due to these competitions being adequately completed. This season therefore saw twenty-two teams competed rather than the sixteen that had been originally expected. This took place within two groups on eleven teams with the top two clubs from either group earning promotion to the Premier League.  The six teams to finish in the bottom three places of both groups relegated to the National Amateur League the following season.

Teams 

Twenty-two teams competed in the league which included the four teams promoted from the Amateur League and four teams relegated from the Premier League. The top two teams from either group achieved automatic promotion with the end of season leaders of the two groups meeting in a playoff to decide who will be the champion for 2021-22. The bottom three clubs of both groups automatically relegated without any playoffs.

League tables

Challenge League Group A

Challenge League Group B

Results

Challenge League Group A Results

Challenge League Group B Results

Championship play-offs

Championship final

References

External links 
 Official website

Malta
1